The Goldsborough House is a historic home located at Cambridge, Dorchester County, Maryland, United States. It is a two-and-a-half-story painted brick Federal-style house with a five-bay symmetrical facade, built about 1793. The house features an Ionic columned entrance portico.

The Goldsborough House was listed on the National Register of Historic Places in 1988.

References

External links
, including photo from 1987, at Maryland Historical Trust

Houses in Dorchester County, Maryland
Houses on the National Register of Historic Places in Maryland
Houses completed in 1793
Federal architecture in Maryland
Cambridge, Maryland
National Register of Historic Places in Dorchester County, Maryland
Goldsborough family